Emmausprisen is the name of a  Norwegian award founded in 1998 by the Norsk Forleggersamband and Norsk Bokhandlersamband. It is given to books that "in an outstanding manner conveys and confirms the Christian faith and Christian values." Past winners include Johannes Heggland, Peter Halldorf, Edvard Hoem, Max Lucado, Henri Nouwen, Janette Oke, Kirsten Sødal, and Lars Amund Vaage.

References 

Norwegian literary awards